Oak Ridge is a village in Morehouse Parish, Louisiana, United States. The population was 142 at the 2000 census. It is part of the Bastrop Micropolitan Statistical Area.

Demographics

As of the census of 2000, there were 142 people, 63 households, and 38 families residing in the village. The racial makeup of the village was 91.55% White, 7.75% African American, and 0.70% from two or more races.

There were 63 households, out of which 28.6% had children under the age of 18 living with them, 57.1% were married couples living together, 4.8% had a female householder with no husband present, and 38.1% were non-families. 34.9% of all households were made up of individuals, and 25.4% had someone living alone who was 65 years of age or older. The average household size was 2.25 and the average family size was 2.95.

In the village, the population was spread out, with 24.6% under the age of 18, 4.2% from 18 to 24, 26.1% from 25 to 44, 23.2% from 45 to 64, and 21.8% who were 65 years of age or older. The median age was 41 years. For every 100 females, there were 89.3 males. For every 100 females age 18 and over, there were 78.3 males.

The median income for a household in the village was $37,500, and the median income for a family was $70,417. Males had a median income of $75,287 versus $24,583 for females. The per capita income for the village was $25,408. There were 9.8% of families and 17.5% of the population living below the poverty line, including 17.5% of under eighteens and 33.3% of those over 64.

Geography
Oak Ridge is located at  (32.623659, -91.774355).

The Jordan Mounds are located near the village.

Notable people
 Edwards Barham, Oak Ridge farmer and former Republican member of the Louisiana State Senate, who served from 1976-1980.
 Abner Wimberly, NFL player for the Green Bay Packers.

References

External links
 Oak Ridge Progress Community Progress Site for Oak Ridge, LA

Villages in Louisiana
Villages in Morehouse Parish, Louisiana